PAGE family member 2B is a protein that in humans is encoded by the PAGE2B gene.

References

Further reading